Willard Gibbs may refer to:

Willard Gibbs (linguist), American linguist and professor of theology and sacred literature at Yale university
Willard Gibbs, his son, American physical chemist

See also
Willard Gibbs Award